Mordellistena ferruginea is a beetle in the genus Mordellistena of the family Mordellidae. It was described in 1801 by Johan Christian Fabricius.

References

ferruginea
Beetles described in 1801